Konstanty Władysław Sobieski (1 May 1680 – 28 February 1726) was a Polish prince, nobleman, politician, diplomat, and scholar. The son of John III Sobieski, King of Poland, and his wife, Marie Casimire Louise de la Grange d'Arquien, Sobieski married Maria Józefa Wessel in 1708.

Early life and career
Konstanty Władysław Sobieski was the youngest son of John III Sobieski. His first tutor was Karlo Mauricio Vota, a Jesuit. Later his teacher became Remigian Suszycki from the University of Cracow and "chevelier de Neufmaison", who taught him about military. Konstanty also learned Italian and French.

Ancestors

References

External links
 Konstanty Wadislaw Sobieski at the Wilanow Palace Museum

Polish Prince Royals
Konstanty Wladyslaw
1680 births
1726 deaths
Sons of kings